[[File:HenleyArms.png|thumb|Arms of Henley: Azure, a lion rampant argent ducally crowned or a bordure of the second charged with eight torteaux. Quartering Bertie. Crest:  A lion's head erased argent charged with hurts and ducally crowned or. Supporters: dexter: A lion argent semée of torteaux langued gules and ducally crowned or; sinister: A stag argent semée of torteaux attired and unguled or. motto: Sola et Unica Virtus'' ("Alone and unique is virtue")]]Baron Henley is a title that has been created twice: first in the Peerage of Great Britain and then in the Peerage of Ireland. The first creation came in 1760 in favour of Sir Robert Henley, Lord High Chancellor of Great Britain, when he was created Lord Henley, Baron of Grainge, in the County of Southampton. In 1764 he was further honoured when he was made Earl of Northington. On the death of his son, the second Earl, both titles became extinct. Lady Elizabeth Henley, youngest daughter of the first Earl and co-heiress of the second Earl, married the diplomat Morton Eden. In 1799, the Henley title was revived when Eden was created Baron Henley, of Chardstock in the County of Dorset, in the Peerage of Ireland. Their son, the second Baron, assumed the surname of Henley in lieu of Eden and notably published a biography of his maternal grandfather. His son, the third Baron, sat as Liberal Member of Parliament for Northampton. In 1885 the Northington title was also revived when he was created Baron Northington, of Watford in the County of Northampton, in the Peerage of the United Kingdom. This title gave the Barons an automatic seat in the House of Lords. The fourth baron Frederick Henley was an educated man who served as JP in Northamptonshire and married Augusta, daughter of Herbert Langham 12th baronet.

His younger son, the sixth Baron, resumed the surname of Eden in 1925, the same year he succeeded his half-brother in the titles.  the peerages are held by his grandson, the eighth Baron, who succeeded his father in 1977. He is a Conservative politician and served in the Conservative administrations of Margaret Thatcher, John Major and David Cameron. Lord Henley is now one of the ninety elected hereditary peers that remain in the House of Lords after the passing of the House of Lords Act 1999.

The Barons Henley are members of the prominent Eden family. The first Baron was the fifth son of Sir Robert Eden, 3rd Baronet, of West Auckland, and the younger brother of William Eden, 1st Baron Auckland. Their elder brother Sir Robert Eden, 1st Baronet, of Maryland (second son of the third Baronet of West Auckland), was the great-great-grandfather of Prime Minister Anthony Eden, 1st Earl of Avon, and the great-great-great-grandfather of the Conservative politician John Benedict Eden, Baron Eden of Winton.

The family seat is Scaleby Castle, near Carlisle, Cumbria.

Barons Henley, first creation (1760)
Robert Henley, 1st Baron Henley (1708–1772) (created Earl of Northington in 1764)

Earls of Northington (1764)
Robert Henley, 1st Earl of Northington (1708–1772)
Robert Henley, 2nd Earl of Northington (1747–1786)

Barons Henley, second creation (1799)
Morton Eden, 1st Baron Henley (1752–1830)
Robert Henley Henley, 2nd Baron Henley (1789–1841)
Anthony Henley Henley, 3rd Baron Henley (1825–1898) (created Baron Northington''' in 1885)
Frederick Henley Henley, 4th Baron Henley, 2nd Baron Northington (1849–1923)
Anthony Ernest Henley Henley, 5th Baron Henley, 3rd Baron Northington (1858–1925)
Francis Robert Eden, 6th Baron Henley, 4th Baron Northington (1877–1962)
Michael Francis Eden, 7th Baron Henley, 5th Baron Northington (1914–1977)
Oliver Michael Robert Eden, 8th Baron Henley, 6th Baron Northington (born 1953)

The heir apparent is the present holder's son, the Hon. John Michael Oliver Eden (born 1988).

Male-line family tree

See also
Earl of Avon
Baron Auckland
Eden baronets

Notes

References

www.edendiaries.co.uk

 
1760 establishments in Great Britain
1786 disestablishments in Great Britain
1799 establishments in Ireland
Baronies in the Peerage of Ireland
Extinct baronies in the Peerage of Great Britain
Noble titles created in 1760
Noble titles created in 1799
Peerages created for the Lord High Chancellor of Great Britain